The Leichhardt Range, part of the Great Dividing Range, is a mountain range located in North Queensland, Australia.

It is composed of a series of rugged hills with folded granite and granodiorite. The age of the rocks vary from Ordovician (490 to 434 million years) to Late Carboniferous (325 to 298 million years). These are interspersed with areas of volcanic rhyolite of the Cambrian Period (545 to 490 million years) at the southern edge.

The range is named after the explorer Ludwig Leichhardt.

See also

List of mountains in Queensland

References

Mountain ranges of Queensland
North Queensland